The Stars Are Shining is a 2015 South Korea morning soap opera starring Go Won-hee, Lee Ha-yool, Seo Yoon-na, and Cha Do-jin. It aired on KBS2 from August 31, 2015, to February 26, 2016, on Mondays to Fridays at 09:00 (KST) to 09:45 (KST).

It is the 39th TV Novel series (8th in 2010s) of KBS.

Summary 
In 1960's, the family of an optimistic girl Jo Bong-hee, fell into difficulties after her father's death. Then, she decided to rekindle her hope and overcomes different obstacles to become the best fashion designer in Korea.

Cast

Main 
 Go Won-hee as Jo Bong-hee
 Lee Ha-yool as Yoon Jong-hyun
 Seo Yoon-na as Seo Mo-ran
 Cha Do-jin as Hong Sung-guk

Supporting

People around Bong-hee 
 Baek Soo-lyeon as Jae Gun-mo (Cameo)
 Song Young-goo as Jo Jae-gun (Cameo)
 Kim Ye-ryeong as Lee Jung-rae
 Kim Ji-woo as Jo Bong-hyun
 Choi Soo-im as Jo Bong-seon

People around Jong-hyun 
 Yoon Joo-sang as Yoon Gil-jae
 Lee Yeon-kyung as Han Bok-joo

People around Mo-ran 
 Im Ho as Seo Dong-pil
 Jo Eun-sook as Oh Ae-suk

People around Sung-guk 
 Kim Hee-won as Choi Kyung-ja
 Lee Du-seop as Jung Man-buk
 Park Seon-woo as Jung Chun-sik
 Yoon Ji-wook as Jung Chul-buk

References

External links
  

Korean Broadcasting System television dramas
Korean-language television shows
2015 South Korean television series debuts
2016 South Korean television series endings